"Dangerous" is a song by French music producer David Guetta released as the second single from his sixth studio album, Listen. It features vocals by American singer and songwriter Sam Martin, who had also appeared on Guetta's previous single "Lovers on the Sun". It was released as a digital download on 6 October 2014. Both artists co-wrote and co-produced the song with Giorgio Tuinfort and Jason Evigan, with additional writing from Lindy Robbins. A remix featuring Trey Songz, Chris Brown, and Martin was released on 9 January 2015.

Composition
The song is written in the key of E minor with the main chord progression of Em—C—Am—D. This song bears similarity to the Akon's song "Ghetto" by the chorus melody.

Music video
A lyric video was released on YouTube on David Guetta's channel. An extended director's cut of the music video was released on October 31. A shorter radio edit version was released on January 21, 2015. It was directed by Jonas Akerlund. The Formula 1-themed video co-starred actor James Purefoy as the rival driver. 2012 Lotus E20 Formula One cars are featured in the video, and then Lotus driver Romain Grosjean makes a cameo appearance, arriving towards the end of the video standing on the podium with Guetta and Purefoy. The video was filmed at Jerez.

Remix
A remix version featuring Trey Songz, Chris Brown, and Sam Martin was premiered on 26 November 2014. David Guetta released it on his SoundCloud account on 10 December 2014. The song was released on iTunes Store in the US on 9 January 2015.

Formats and track listings

Charts

Weekly charts

Year-end charts

Certifications

References

2014 singles
David Guetta songs
2014 songs
Parlophone singles
Number-one singles in Austria
Number-one singles in Finland
SNEP Top Singles number-one singles
Number-one singles in Germany
Number-one singles in Greece
Number-one singles in Israel
Number-one singles in Norway
Number-one singles in Poland
Number-one singles in Russia
Number-one singles in Spain
Number-one singles in Switzerland
Songs written by David Guetta
Songs written by Giorgio Tuinfort
Songs written by Jason Evigan
Songs written by Lindy Robbins
Songs written by Sam Martin (singer)
Ultratop 50 Singles (Wallonia) number-one singles
Song recordings produced by David Guetta
Music videos directed by Jonas Åkerlund